Shaking the Tree: Sixteen Golden Greats is a compilation album by the English rock musician Peter Gabriel. It was released in 1990 as Gabriel's first career retrospective, including songs from his first solo album Peter Gabriel (I or Car) (1977), through Passion: Music for The Last Temptation of Christ (1989). It was remastered with most of Gabriel's catalogue in 2002.

Track selection
The tracks are creatively re-ordered, ignoring chronology. Some of the tracks were different from the album versions. New parts were recorded for several tracks in Gabriel's Real World Studios. Most songs are edited for time, either as radio, single, or video edit versions. "Shaking the Tree"—a track from Youssou N'Dour's 1989 album The Lion—is a 1990 version featuring new vocals from Gabriel. "I Have the Touch" is listed as a 1983 remix, although it is actually the 1985 remix which appeared on the "Sledgehammer" single. (The 1985 remix is similar to the 1983 remix, which appeared as the B-side of the "Walk Through the Fire" single, but is edited down to 3m 45s long, as here.)

"Here Comes the Flood" is a new recording from 1990. This version is a piano and voice arrangement, that is far simpler than the highly produced version on Peter Gabriel (1977). Its sparseness is closer to the version that Gabriel recorded with Robert Fripp on Fripp's Exposure (1979). In interviews, Gabriel has said that he preferred the 1979 version, and it was that version with Fripp that he chose to overdub in German as the flipside of the single "Biko" released before Ein deutsches Album (1980).

Although this album highlights songs from Peter Gabriel's earlier albums, tracks from Peter Gabriel (II, or Scratch) and the soundtrack to the film Birdy are not included. "In Your Eyes" is notably missing from the compilation. Say Anything..., in which it was played in a prominent scene, had been released the year before. Although this made "In Your Eyes" perhaps the most well known Peter Gabriel song aside from "Sledgehammer" in the U.S., it was omitted from the album in favour of five of the other eight tracks from So — four other hits and the album track "Mercy Street".

Track listing
NOTE: All tracks marked with * are not on the vinyl release of the album.

Personnel
"Solsbury Hill"
Bob Ezrin – production
Larry Fast – synthesizer
Robert Fripp – guitar
Peter Gabriel – vocals
Steve Hunter – guitar
Tony Levin – bass guitar
Alan Schwartzberg – drums

"I Don't Remember" (Edited version)
Larry Fast – processing
Robert Fripp – guitar
Peter Gabriel – piano, synthesizer, vocals, and production
Tony Levin – Chapman Stick
Jerry Marrotta – drums
David Rhodes – guitar
Peter Walsh – production

"Sledgehammer" (Single edit)
P.P. Arnold – backing vocals
Peter Gabriel – Fairlight CMI, Prophet, piano, vocals, production
Carol Gordon – backing vocals
Manu Katche – drums
Wayne Jackson – trumpet
Daniel Lanois – production
Tony Levin – bass guitar
Dee Lewis – backing vocals
Don Mikkelsen – trombone
David Rhodes – guitar
Mark Rivera – saxophone

"Family Snapshot"
Larry Fast – synthesizer
Phil Collins – snare drum
Peter Gabriel – piano, vocals
John Giblin – bass guitar
Dave Gregory – guitar
Steve Lillywhite – production
Jerry Marrotta – drums
Dick Morrissey – saxophone
David Rhodes – guitar

"Mercy Street" (Edited version)
Djalma Correa – surdu, congas, and triangle
Peter Gabriel – Fairlight CMI, Prophet, piano, CS80, vocals, and production
Larry Klein – bass guitar
Daniel Lanois – production
Mark Rivera – processed saxophone

"Shaking the Tree" (1990 remix)
George Acogny – Fairlight CMI percussion
Roger Bolton – Fairlight CMI percussion and sequencing
Simon Clark – organ, piano, keyboard bass, and synthesizer
Habib Faye – bass guitar, guitar
Peter Gabriel – vocals and re-recorded vocals
Manu Katche – drums
Youssou N'Dour – vocals
David Rhodes – acoustic and electric guitar

"Don't Give Up" (Edited version)
Peter Gabriel – chant, vocals, CMI, Prophet, piano, production
Kate Bush – vocals, chant
David Rhodes  – guitar
Tony Levin  – bass guitar
Simon Clark  – chorus CS 80 
Richard Tee  – piano 
Daniel Lanois – production

"San Jacinto"
Peter Gabriel – vocals, production
David Lord – production

"Here Comes the Flood" (1990 re-recording)
Peter Gabriel – piano, vocals, and production

"Red Rain"
Peter Gabriel – vocals, production
Daniel Lanois – production

"Games Without Frontiers" (Single edit)
Steve Lillywhite – production
 Kate Bush - background vocals

"Shock the Monkey" (Radio edit)
Peter Gabriel – vocals, production
David Lord – production

"I Have the Touch" (1983 remix)
Peter Gabriel – keyboards, vocals, and production
David Lord – production
Simon Phillips – drums
James Guthrie – remix engineer

"Big Time"
Peter Gabriel – vocals, production
Daniel Lanois – production

"Zaar" (Edited version)
Peter Gabriel – production

"Biko" (Edited version)
Steve Lillywhite – production

Additional
Alexander Knaust – styling and photography assistance
Robert Mapplethorpe – photography
Mouat Nomad, London – design

Charts

Weekly charts

Year-end charts

Certifications

References

External links

1990 greatest hits albums
Albums produced by Bob Ezrin
Albums produced by Daniel Lanois
Albums produced by Peter Gabriel
Albums produced by Steve Lillywhite
Geffen Records compilation albums
Peter Gabriel albums
Virgin Records compilation albums